is a Japanese footballer who plays for Samut Songkhram in Thai Premier League.

References

1983 births
Living people
Japanese footballers
Japanese expatriate footballers
Expatriate footballers in Thailand

Association football midfielders
Tochigi SC players
Giravanz Kitakyushu players
Isao Kubota